Zhang Yu (born 25 September 1995) is a Chinese female volleyball player. She is part of the China women's national volleyball team.
She participated in the 2015 FIVB Volleyball World Grand Prix.
On club level she played for Beijing BAW in 2015.

Clubs 

  Beijing BAW

References

External links 

 FIVB Biography

Chinese women's volleyball players
Living people
1995 births
Middle blockers
21st-century Chinese women